Kesküla is an Estonian surname. Notable people with the surname include:
Aleksander Kesküla (1882–1963), politician and revolutionary
Kalev Kesküla (1959–2010), writer and journalist
Kert Kesküla (1975–2011), basketball player

See also
Keskküla (disambiguation)

Estonian-language surnames